In probability theory, the Doob–Dynkin lemma, named after Joseph L. Doob and Eugene Dynkin, characterizes the situation when one random variable is a function of another by the inclusion of the -algebras generated by the random variables. The usual statement of the lemma is formulated in terms of one random variable being measurable with respect to the -algebra generated by the other.

The lemma plays an important role in the conditional expectation in probability theory, where it allows replacement of the conditioning on a random variable by conditioning on the -algebra that is generated by the random variable.

Notations and introductory remarks

is the smallest -algebra on  such that  is -measurable.

Statement of the lemma
Let  be a function, and  a measurable space. A function  is -measurable if and only if  for some -measurable 

Remark. The "if" part simply states that the composition of two measurable functions is measurable. The "only if" part is proven below.

Remark.

By definition, the measurability of  means that  for every Borel set  Therefore  and the lemma may be restated as follows.

Lemma. Then  for some -measurable  if and only if .

See also
 Conditional expectation

References

 A. Bobrowski: Functional analysis for probability and stochastic processes: an introduction, Cambridge University Press (2005),  
 M. M. Rao, R. J. Swift : Probability Theory with Applications, Mathematics and Its Applications, vol. 582, Springer-Verlag (2006),  

Probability theorems
Theorems in measure theory